The Robert H. MacArthur Award is a biennial prize given by the Ecological Society of America to ecologists for their pivotal contributions to their field. The acceptance speeches of many recipients have been given at the annual meeting of the society and subsequently published in the ESA's journal, Ecology.

The following is a self-descriptive quote taken from the Robert H. MacArthur Award page on the ESA's website: "The Robert H. MacArthur Award is given biennially to an established ecologist in mid-career for meritorious contributions to ecology, in the expectation of continued outstanding ecological research. Nominees may be from any country and need not be ESA members. The recipient is invited to prepare an address for presentation at the annual meeting of the society and for publication in Ecology."

Recipients
Source: ESA
1983 Robert Treat Paine, United States
1984 Robert McCreadie May, United Kingdom
1986 Thomas W. Schoener, United States
1988 Simon Asher Levin, United States
1990 William W. Murdoch, United States
1992 Peter M. Vitousek, United States
1994 Henry Miles Wilbur, United States
1996 David Tilman, United States
1998 Robert V. O'Neill, United States
2000 Stephen R. Carpenter, United States
2002 James H. Brown, United States
2004 May Berenbaum, United States
2006 Alan Hastings, United States
2008 Monica Turner, United States
2010 Stephen W. Pacala, United States
2012 Anthony Ragnar Ives, United States
2014 Mercedes Pascual, United States
2016 Anurag A. Agrawal, United States
2018 Katharine N. Suding. United States
2020 Jonathan M. Levine, United States
2022 Priyanga Amarasekare, United States

See also

 List of ecology awards

References

External links
 

American science and technology awards
Awards established in 1983
Ecology awards